Eadweard is the Anglo-Saxon form of Edward. It may refer to:

 Eadweard I (c. 874–924), known as Edward the Elder, king of the Anglo-Saxons
 Eadweard II (c. 962–978), known as Edward the Martyr, king of England
 Eadweard III (c. 1003–1066), known as Edward the Confessor, king of England
 Eadweard Muybridge (1830–1904), English photographer
 Eadweard Muybridge, Zoopraxographer, a 1975 American documentary film
 Eadweard (film), a 2015 Canadian drama film

See also
 Eadward, 12th-century prelate in Scotland
 Edward (disambiguation)